The National Institute for Discovery Science (NIDSci) was a privately financed research organization based in Las Vegas, Nevada, USA, and operated from 1995 to 2004. It was founded in 1995 by real-estate developer Robert Bigelow, who set it up to research and advance serious study of various fringe science and paranormal topics, most notably ufology. Deputy Administrator Colm Kelleher was quoted as saying the organization was not designed to study UFOs only. "We don't study aliens, we study anomalies. They're the same thing in a lot of people's minds, but not in our minds." NIDSci was disbanded in October 2004.

History
The National Institute for Discovery Science, known also as NIDS, was founded by Robert Bigelow serving as a way to channel funds into the scientific study of paranormal phenomena. The NIDS performed research in the area of cattle mutilation and black triangle reports. 

The NIDSci bought Skinwalker Ranch after journalist George Knapp first wrote about it in 1996, and Deputy Administrator Colm Kelleher led the investigation for a number of years.

A hotline was established in 1999 to receive reports of odd occurrences. Over 5,000 calls and e-mails were received by the organization. Officials say many were explained as missile test launches and meteors.

See also
 Bigelow Aerospace
 Advanced Aerospace Threat Identification Program
 Unidentified Aerial Phenomena Task Force

References

External links
 Snapshot of NIDSci site at the Internet Archive (archived October 7, 2007)
 NIDS - Robert Bigelow — a collection of news articles about the NIDS' early days
 The UFO Hunters - Scientists at National Institute for Discovery Science study anomalous phenomena
Where the Steers and the Aliens Play an article by Sean Castel in Fate, August, 1998
  The End of the National Institute for Discovery Science (NIDS)
Bigelow’s Aerospace and Saucer Emporium, Skeptical Inquirer 33.4, July/August 2009

UFO organizations
Scientific organizations based in the United States
Pseudoscience
UFO culture in the United States
Organizations based in Nevada